Joe Hargrave is a Canadian politician, who served as the Member for the Legislative Assembly of Saskatchewan for the electoral district of Prince Albert Carlton. He was first elected in the 2016 provincial election, when he succeeded retiring Saskatchewan Party MLA Darryl Hickie. He is a member of the Saskatchewan Party.

Hargrave was selected as the Saskatchewan Party candidate in a heavily contested nomination meeting, which was conducted in the Prince Albert Exhibition Centre. Hargrave based his nomination strategy on an economic focus, saying that a strong economy would also include access to healthcare and other public goods, and suggesting that his own experience in business would make him a good representative.

On August 23, 2016, Hargrave was named to the Executive Council of Saskatchewan as the Minister of Crown Investments Corporation, the Minister Responsible for Saskatchewan Government Insurance and Minister Responsible for Saskatchewan Transportation Company.

He was shuffled to become Minister of Highways on November 9, 2020.

On January 4, 2021, Hargrave announced his resignation from the position after facing criticism, amidst the COVID-19 pandemic in Saskatchewan and closure of the border between Canada and the United States, for going on a personal trip to Palm Springs, California to "finalise" the sale of a home there, in contradiction of recommendations issued by the province.

Electoral history

2016 Saskatchewan general election

Cabinet positions

References

Living people
Saskatchewan Party MLAs
Members of the Executive Council of Saskatchewan
Politicians from Prince Albert, Saskatchewan
21st-century Canadian politicians
Year of birth missing (living people)